The Copa Dominicana de Fútbol is the top tournament association football in the Dominican Republic. Created in 2015, it is open to all clubs and is affiliated with the Dominican Football Federation.

Participating clubs

Liga Dominicana de Futbol

Semi-pro & Amateur teams

Group Phase

Group A

Group B

Group C

Group D

Knockout stage

References

External links
http://www.futboltotalrd.com/p/copa-dominicana-goleadores-temporada.html 
http://ldf.com.do/primera-version-copa-dominicana-de-futbol/
http://almomento.net/copa-dominicana-de-futbol-con-mejores-equipos-rd/149555
http://www.balompiedominicano.com/2015/11/copa-dominicana-de-futbol-continua-este.html
http://www.diariolibre.com/deportes/futbol/om-y-atletico-fc-inician-copa-dominicana-de-futbol-IB1726813

Football in the Dominican Republic